Xenolimnobia is a genus of crane flies in the family Limoniidae.

Distribution
Cameroon, Nigeria.

Species
X. camerounensis Alexander, 1926

References

Limoniidae
Tipuloidea genera
Diptera of Africa